Sharptor is a hamlet west of Henwood in the civil parish of Linkinhorne in east Cornwall, England, United Kingdom. It is named after Sharp Tor on Bodmin Moor. Sharptor is close to Minions to the south, Kingbeare in the north and Darleyford to the east.

On a clear day, east and just to the right of Kill Hill, Dartmoor can be seen.

History 
Before Sharptor, there was a lot of human activity in the area including a prehistoric hillfort and field systems on Stowe's Hill and Neolithic cairns, field systems and enclosures on Sharp Tor.

There are several mine works and quarries close to Sharptor. Most of the properties in Sharptor were for workers, and most are orientated to face east so as to wake the occupants as the sun rose in the morning.. According to the 1871 census, there were 21 residents in Sharptor, most of the men (around 43%) working in the quarries and the remainder (35%) working in mining. It is interesting that Sharptor seemed to be a male enclave with only 4 women residents. The average age was around 36.

Many of the houses are constructed from moorstone, a form of Cornish granite. The stone was formed into shape using a plug and feather method hence it is common to see the remnants of the hole drilled to split the rock (see image of fireplace below).
 
At the top of the Sharptor road are the remains of the Liskeard and Caradon Railway which opened in 1844 and closed in 1917. The track materials were removed to aid the war effort, but many of the stone sleepers remain. The railway can be easily walked to Minions.

Sharp Tor or West Sharptor Mine was held under a lease for 21 years, from 1849, granted by the Duke of Cornwall, who owns most of the mineral rights around Sharptor. The mine was first opened in 1850 and was worked for copper. The original company had 256 shares, with £62 paid for each, representing a capital of £15,872; the amount expended to 1855 was about £15,000. The mine was worked using a 60-horsepower steam engine installed by Willam West in 1850. The mine lies within the Phoenix United Mine district. Ore was shipped to Looe. 

Although the primary mineral was copper, there are other minerals that can be found in the mine tailings such as brochantite, cassiterite, chalcocite, chalcopyrite, chamosite, connellite, langite, pyrite, quartz, copper(I) oxide (known locally as tile ore) and orthochamosite (daphnite).

As the railway was built so the Cheesewring Quarry was developed. The fine silver Granite was in demand for engineering and architectural work. As the tin was sent to Looe, so was the granite where it was shipped to London and further afield. Nineteenth century structures built from the granite included Devonport Dockyard, as well as the docks at Birkenhead and Copenhagen. Other structures include the breakwaters at Alderney and Dover, the Spithead forts, Thames Embankment, Westminster Bridge, Tower Bridge and a lighthouse in Sri Lanka (then known as Ceylon). The quarry, for most of its history, was owned and worked by John Freeman and Sons, who had over 80 quarries in Cornwall. At its peak, there were over a 100 men and boys working at the quarry. But after World War I, the decline in demand and also difficulty in extracting fine granite from under the Cheesewring (now an attraction) meant the quarry went into decline. 

Several of the houses in Sharptor and Henwood were extended, and one issue was the use of Mundic block (blocks made from mine waste) for construction between 1900 and 1960.

In 1944, an American transport plane hit Sharp Tor and several fragments of the plane were found and removed.

The maps highlight the location of Sharptor Mine in 1877 and 1907. Most of the buildings that were mapped in both years remain until today. The mine chimney has been removed but some of the structures remain and it is believed that one property was previously used as an engine house. Although the mine has been open for years, most of the engine house has now fallen into the shaft.

Tourism
There have been some visitors over the years who have been struck by Sharp Tor and the views:

Thomas Bond, 1823—Sharpy-torry (Sharp-torr from its conical shape), the views brought to my mind the beautiful lines in Ovid:
Tum freta diffundi rapidisque tumescere ventis
Jussit, et ambitæ circumdare littora terræ.
Addidit et fontes, immensaque stagna lacusque. 
Jussit et extendi campos, subsidere valles,
Fronde tegi silvas, lapidosos surgere montes.
Then he ordered the seas to be poured abroad, and to swell with furious winds, and to draw a shore quite round the inclosed earth. He Likewise added springs, and immense pools and lakes. He ordered likewise plains to be extended, and valleys to sink; the woods to be covered with green leaves, and the rocky mountains to rise.

Cyrus Redding, 1842—Sharp Point Tor is directly south of Kilmarth, is equal to it in height, and on the south-east side has a curious assemblage of rocks.

 John Allen, 1856—Sharptor, a fine, pointed, granite hill.

E. T. Crabb, 1876—Sharp Tor or Sharp Point Tor is a conical hill of granite boulders, whose vertex is 1200 feet above the sea. The panoramic scenery from its top is grand and interesting.

E.C. Axford, 1975—The conical Sharp Tor overhangs it as Mount Sinai overhung the village of Morality in The Pilgrim's Progress.

E V. Thompson,1975—Sharptor: from here one has a breathtaking view of the whole East Cornwall.

Local attractions include the Cheesewring, a number of granite stones on Stowe's Hill; the Darley Oak, an ancient tree thought to be 1,000 years old; The Hurlers, a group of three ancient stone circles; Gold Diggings Quarry, a popular spot for swimming; Daniel Gumb's cave, the home to a stonecutter and his family;, Siblyback Lake a reservoir with a 3.2-mile (5.1 km) walk, various water sports and fishing (Rainbow trout and Blue trout); Golitha Falls a natural waterfall walk on the River Fowey; King Doniert's Stone, two pieces of decorated 9th century cross believed to commemorate Dungarth, King of Cornwall and the nearby Rillaton Barrow, an ancient burial mound.

Climate

Weather 
Sharptor has an Oceanic climate according to the Köppen climate classification but, like the rest of Bodmin Moor, due to its high altitude, it is often cooler, windier and wetter than further down the valley off the moor. However, there is a good balance of fair days too, which can get warm in the summer. In winter, frosts are common and even though it snows most years, it is never prolonged or severe. However, in previous years, residents have been snowed in.

Weather phenomena 
Being on Bodmin Moor, often there is a mist but when clear, Dartmoor can be seen in the distance. Also, some weather phenomena can be seen such as 22° haloes and "white of morning" a local reference to when the morning mist cloaks lower elevations down from Sharptor in the River Lynher valley. Often this is referred to as valley fog where fog is trapped in the bowl of a valley.

Flora and fauna

Flora 
Native trees around Sharptor include hawthorn, blackthorn/sloe, hazel, oak, rowan and elderberry. Many of the trees that are protected from the wind have lichen growing from the branches. There are also a large number of conifers, rhododendrons and many buddleja that have been planted or self-seeded.

There is also a proliferation of gorse and bracken. As bracken is a highly invasive species, residents can often be seen stomping fields to break the stems to prevent growth. As parts of Sharptor are within a Site of Special Scientific Interest (SSSI) it is important to control bracken to protect existing flora and fauna.

Fauna 
Fauna seen commonly around Sharptor are red fox, several corvidae such as raven, magpie, and jay. Smaller birds that are common include Wagtail, European robin, wren, treecreeper, European stonechat, European golden plover, common cuckoo, common skylark, meadow pipit, wheatear, redwing, mistle thrush and woodpecker. Birds of prey include barn owl, red kite, common buzzard and kestrel. Recently (2023), a nightingale has been heard singing at Sharptor but no sightings have been reported.

Bats are also prevalent at dusk due to several derelict buildings and mine adits. Common bats found around Sharptor include greater horseshoe, lesser horseshoe and brown long-eared.

Unlike Dartmoor, there is no specific breed of pony on Bodmin Moor. However, they do roam free and are rounded up in the autumn for sale, generally at auction. Like the ponies, there is no specific breed of sheep but there are some common breeds found on the moor. Popular breeds are Scottish Blackface and North Country Cheviot replacing more traditional breeds of Devon and Cornwall Longwool and Greyface Dartmoor. There are various sheep creeps around the Sharptor area to allow sheep to pass through the heavy Cornish hedge. There are also cattle on the moors around Sharptor with popular breeds being Highland, Galloway and Blue Grey. Ponies, sheep and cattle are often found in the fields and lanes around Sharptor.

Sport and recreation 
Sharptor offers some good walks and cycling, including routes to Sharp Tor and Stowe's Hill. There are several climbing and bouldering opportunities. Sharptor gives direct access to Bodmin Moor on horseback, but the road is steep and vehicular access is restrictive.

Nearby, Lower Lake Shooting Ground offers instruction from total beginner to advanced Clay pigeon shooting.

Food and drink 
Although Sharptor itself does not have any outlets for food or drink, there are two nearby cafes in Minions. One cafe is also a post office and village shop. There is also a village shop in Pensilva that is also an off-license, lottery outlet, PayPoint and has an ATM.

There has been a public house in Minions dating back to 1836. The current public house, The Cheesewring, suffered a fire that started on the morning of the 24th December 2021 which caused substantial damage. Many of the residents of Sharptor would walk to The Cheesewring across the moor. As of January 2023, the pub has been made safe but no work has been undertaken and there does not seem to be a plan to re-open.

There are a number of other public houses nearby including The Wheal Tor, which is also a hotel, restaurant and glamping site. The Manor House at Rilla Mill which is a pub and restaurant and the Caradon Inn at Upton Cross which also has a small shop. Slightly further afield is The Market Inn at St Cleer and The Racehorse in North Hill, which was formerly a school and named after the first owners fathers passion for horse racing, after a being a shop and between closing, reopened in 2022 as The Old School Inn. The Victoria Inn at Pensilva has been closed for some time and it was thought that the land may be used for residential development but their website says that the pub has reopened. Unfortunately, the Crows Nest at Darite has closed due to economic circumstances and changes in the personal circumstances of the owners. February 2023, new owners at the Crows Nest announce they will be opening soon.

Transport

Bus 
Sharptor is relatively remote and does not have any direct public transport links. The nearest bus stop is at Darley Ford Garage, where the 112 bus (Callington Community College to Minions) and 236 bus (Liskeard to Launceston, via Darite, North Hill and South Petherwin) stop.

Rail 
The nearest mainline rail service is Liskeard, . Trains run northwest to London Paddington station and southwest to Penzance railway station. The trains are run by GWR.

Air 
The airport runs mainly a seasonal schedule running flights to Manchester, London-Gatwick, London-Heathrow, Alicante, Edinburgh, Glasgow, Newcastle, Faro, Leeds Bradford, Teesside, Birmingham and St Mary's. 

Newquay airport is also home to Cornwall Air Ambulance and HM Coastguard, who's helicopters are regularly seen over Sharp Tor and Stowe's Hill training.

Space 
In 2019, it was announced that the airport would host Spaceport Cornwall a base for Virgin Orbit. 

In January 2023, the first attempt to launch the first UK rocket taking satellites into space suffered an anomaly, spelling an end to the mission. Cosmic Girl, a modified Boeing 747-400 jet, took off on 9th January 2023 and launched LauncherOne which failed to reach orbit.

Culture 
Sharptor Mine is mentioned in the Retallick Saga by E. V. Thompson. E. V. Thompson was a resident of Sharptor and lived in Idle Cottage, one of the stone miners' cottages in lower Sharptor. One of Mr. Thompson's books, Chase the Wind, was voted the best historical novel of the year (1980). He Said The storylines come from researching. In my very first book I was sitting on the doorstep of an old miner's cottage, wondering about the people who lived there before - most probably Idle Cottage.

A nearby previous resident of Minions and his rather unusual bovine friend were featured in an award-winning short film "Tony & The Bull". Scrunch, a Highland bull, was found as a calf on the moor, and Tony house-trained him and lived in a former run-down pub close to Minions. Sadly both have passed away and were cremated and buried together.

Also nearby, is the Sterts Theatre and Arts Centre which is a converted pig farm with an open-air amphitheater and arts centre. The conversion was undertaken by the founders Ewart and Anne Sturrock in 1982. Sterts puts on high-quality live performances, from family-friendly musicals to comedy nights and other live events in an open-air atmosphere.

Gallery

References

Hamlets in Cornwall